Scott Pladel (born November 25, 1962) is an American bobsledder. He competed in the four man event at the 1988 Winter Olympics.

References

External links
 

1962 births
Living people
American male bobsledders
Olympic bobsledders of the United States
Bobsledders at the 1988 Winter Olympics
Sportspeople from Albany, New York
20th-century American people